

German Evangelical Lutheran Church of St. Mark is a historic church and synagogue building at 323 East 6th Street between First and Second Avenues in the East Village neighborhood of Manhattan, New York City.  The Renaissance Revival style church was built in 1847 by the Evangelical Lutheran Church of St. Matthew which first rented it to St. Mark's and subsequently sold it to them in 1857. By the end of the nineteenth century the congregation was in decline as congregants were moving elsewhere. Much of the church membership was killed in the 1904 General Slocum disaster, most of the victims being women and children, and the congregation never recovered.

In 1940, the church was converted to the Community Synagogue Max D. Raiskin Center, an Orthodox Jewish congregation.

General Slocum disaster
In 1904, The Ladies' Aid Society (Frauenhilfsverein) chartered the General Slocum steamboat for their summer outing on the East River. The boat caught fire and over 1000 parishioners perished in one of the worst disasters in the city's history. Thereafter Germans began moving uptown from the Lower East Side, primarily to Yorkville and abandoned the church. The parish of St. Mark's merged with the Zion Church in Yorkville in 1946 to become Zion St. Mark's Evangelical Lutheran Church.

Preservation
The building was listed on the National Register of Historic Places in 2004, and is located within the East Village/Lower East Side Historic District, which was created in October 2012.

References

External links

Churches in Manhattan
German-American culture in New York City
Properties of religious function on the National Register of Historic Places in Manhattan
Renaissance Revival architecture in New York City
Churches completed in 1847
19th-century Lutheran churches in the United States
Lutheran churches in New York (state)
East Village, Manhattan
1847 establishments in New York (state)
Historic district contributing properties in Manhattan
Orthodox synagogues in New York City